Ross, or the Southern division of Herefordshire was a county constituency centred on the town of Ross-on-Wye in Herefordshire.  It returned one Member of Parliament (MP)  to the House of Commons of the Parliament of the United Kingdom, elected by the first past the post voting system.

The constituency was created under the Redistribution of Seats Act 1885 for the 1885 general election, when the three-seat Herefordshire constituency was replaced by two single-member county divisions: the Leominster (or Northern) division, and the Ross (or Southern) division.

Ross was abolished for the 1918 general election.

Boundaries 
The Sessional Divisions of Dore, Harewood's Ends, Hereford, Ledbury and Ross and the Municipal Borough of Hereford.

Members of Parliament

Elections

Elections in the 1880s

Elections in the 1890s

Elections in the 1900s

Elections in the 1910s

General Election 1914–15:

Another General Election was required to take place before the end of 1915. The political parties had been making preparations for an election to take place and by the July 1914, the following candidates had been selected; 
Unionist: Percy Clive
Liberal: Clement Woodbine Parish

References 

Parliamentary constituencies in Herefordshire (historic)
Constituencies of the Parliament of the United Kingdom established in 1885
Constituencies of the Parliament of the United Kingdom disestablished in 1918